Economic Policy is a quarterly peer-reviewed academic journal published by Oxford Academic on behalf of the Centre for Economic Policy Research, the Center for Economic Studies (University of Munich), and the Paris School of Economics. The journal was established in 1985 and covers international economic policy topics such as macroeconomics, microeconomics, the labour market, trade, exchange rate, taxation, economic growth, government spending, and migration.  

The journal had an impact factor of 2.844 in 2016, ranking it 33/347 in the category "Economics".

References

External links 
 

Wiley-Blackwell academic journals
English-language journals
Publications established in 1985
Quarterly journals
Economics journals